OK Baytong is a 2003 Thai drama film about Buddhist-Muslim relations in southern Thailand. It is written and directed by Nonzee Nimibutr.

Plot

Tum is a young man who has been a monk living in a Buddhist temple in Thailand since he was 5 years old. But after hearing that his sister has been killed in an attack on a train by insurgents, he decides to leave the monastery and make his way to southern Thailand where his sister ran a beauty salon in a town called Betong in a district in Yala Province on the border with Malaysia.

In looking to put his sister's affairs in order, Tum finds himself conflicted. Should he take over his sister's business? His sister has a daughter, by a Muslim man who lives on the Malaysian side of the border. Should Tum try to take a greater role in the raising of the child?

But first, Tum must figure out how to zip up his trousers without hurting himself. It's only one of the many new things to the young man, who has worn a Buddhist monk's robes for most of his life. He also encounters romantic and sexual feelings when he develops a relationship with a neighbor lady, who was a friend of his sister.

And, Tum must reconcile the feelings of hate and rage that sometimes come into his head when he thinks about Muslim people and the insurgents who were responsible for his sister's death.

Cast
 Phoovarit Phumpuang as Tum
 Jeeranan Manojam as Lynn
 Saranya Kruengsai

Film festivals
OK Baytong was shown at many film festivals worldwide in 2004, including:
 Bangkok International Film Festival
 Berlin Film Festival
 Hawaii International Film Festival
 Hong Kong International Film Festival
 New York Asian Film Festival
 Pusan International Film Festival
 Seattle International Film Festival
 Vancouver International Film Festival

External links
 Official page at Cinemasia
 

2003 films
Thai drama films
Thai-language films
2003 drama films
Films about Buddhism
Sahamongkol Film International films